Dunoyer is a surname. Notable people with the surname include:
 
 Charles Dunoyer (1786–1862), French economist
 Philippe Dunoyer (born 1968), French politician

See also
 Dunoyer de Segonzac (disambiguation)

Surnames of French origin
French-language surnames